The 2006 Cork Junior A Hurling Championship was the 109th staging of the Cork Junior A Hurling Championship since its establishment by the Cork County Board in 1895. The championship began on 24 September 2006 and 28 October 2006.

On 28 October 2006, Kilworth won the championship following a 0-13 to 0-12 defeat of Dungourney in the final at Páirc Uí Rinn. This was their second championship title in the grade and their first since 1967.

Brian Dillons's John Horgan was the championship's top scorer with 1-15.

Qualification

Results

Bracket

First round

Semi-finals

Final

Championship statistics

Top scorers

Overall

In a single game

References

Cork Junior Hurling Championship
Cork Junior Hurling Championship